The list of culture universities in Ukraine includes state education institutions of Ukraine of the 3rd and 4th accreditation levels such as universities, academies, conservatories and institutes. The list only specializes in various schools for arts, music, culture and design.

Most of arts, music and culture educational state institutions are administered by the Ministry of Culture.

Kyiv
 Kyiv National University of theater, cinema and television
 Tchaikovsky National Academy of Music
 National Academy of Visual Arts and Architecture
 Kyiv State Institute of Decorative Applied Arts and Design
 Kyiv National University of Culture and Arts

Kharkiv Oblast
 Kharkiv National University of Arts
 Kharkiv State Academy of Culture
 Kharkiv State Academy of Design and Arts

Lviv Oblast
 Lviv National Music Academy
 Lviv National Academy of Arts

Odessa Oblast
 Odessa State Music Academy

Crimea
 Crimean University of Culture, Arts and Tourism

Luhansk Oblast
 Luhansk State Institute of Culture and Arts

Zakarpattia Oblast
 Transcarpathian Art Institute

See also
 List of universities in Ukraine
 List of medical universities in Ukraine
 Open access in Ukraine to scholarly communication

Culture Universities
Ukraine